KNCN (101.3 FM, "C101") is a radio station licensed to Sinton, Texas playing to the Corpus Christi metro area. It is under ownership of iHeartMedia.  The station's studios and offices are located on Old Brownsville Road in Corpus Christi (near the airport), and its transmitter tower is located west of Portland, Texas and north of Nueces Bay in San Patricio County.

History
It signed on July 1, 1972 from a combined studio and tower site north of the bay north of Corpus Christi and east of Sinton, Texas. Facilities were the same as now, which is a 100,000-watt signal from a 410-foot antenna. The studio site had on air studios, a bathroom, and the transmitter room. The first main transmitter was a Collins 831-G1.  Most recently, the station switched to the active rock panel per Mediabase.

From 1972 to 1976 the 101.3 frequency had been used by KMIO.

KNCN was known as C-101 and went on the air in 1976 with a rock format. In later years, sales offices were established in the business center of CCT. They were once in the "600 Building" downtown, and later had their own building on Leopard street. Early on the station received permission from the FCC to identify as a Sinton-Taft station. A bit later they changed that to a Sinton-Corpus Christi identifier.

The station was founded by local owners. It was sold to Tippie Communications (whose shareholders had been involved with KHFI-AM-FM-TV in Austin, with Rollins/Terminix, and by the eighties with KVLY-FM in Edinburg, Texas and an FM in the Colorado Springs, Colorado area.

The station has been anchored by different DJs throughout the years and has been programmed by some known radio names.

Morning Shows included Greg and LJ, Ray Lytle and Jon Lamb, Tim and Rex “Two Guys in the Morning”.  Hannah Storm of ESPN had a brief stint as a C-101 DJ in the early 1980s.  The station was purchased by a company that was rolled up into Clear Channel Communications (now iHeartMedia).

External links

NCN
Active rock radio stations in the United States
IHeartMedia radio stations